The Bilderberg Conference in 1954 was the first annual meeting of European politicians, bankers and monarchs and American politicians and bankers. The founders and promoters were Prince Bernhard of the Netherlands (who was the president of the meeting until 1976) and the Polish political advisor Józef Retinger. It took place in the Hotel de Bilderberg, Oosterbeek, Netherlands, and was held 29–31 May 1954.

Agenda
 The attitude towards communism and the Soviet Union. 
 The attitude towards dependent areas and people overseas. 
 The attitude towards economic policies and problems. 
 The attitude towards European integration and the European Defense Community.

Delegates (alphabetical)
 Robert Andre, President of the Syndicat de Petrole.
 Ralph Assheton, Member of Parliament, former Parliamentary Secretary to Ministry of Supply and
 G. De Beaumont, Member of Parliament
 Prince Bernhard of Lippe-Biesterfeld, prince-consort of the Netherlands (co-founder)
 Pierre Bonvoisin,	Banker, President of the "Banque de la Societe Generale de Belgique".
 Robert Boothby, Member of Parliament.
 Max Brauer, Former Mayor and President of the Land of Hamburg
 Raffaele Cafiero, U.S Senator
 Walker L. Cisler, Public Utility Executive. President of The Detroit Edison Co.
 Gardner Cowles, Jr., Publisher from the United States.
 Clement Davies, U.K. Member of Parliament. Former Minister.
 Jean Drapier, Lawyer from Belgium.
 John H. Ferguson,	Lawyer, Vice-President and Executive Director for a National Trade Policy.
 John Foster, Member of Parliament in the UK.
 Oliver Franks, Former Ambassador in Washington. Chairman of Lloyd's Bank.
 Gerhard P. Th. Geyer, Industrialist, Director General of the oil company "Esso".
 Colin Gubbins, Major General retd. Formerly in charge of SOE.
 Denis Healey, Member of Parliament,
 H. J. Heinz II, former President of H.J. Heinz Co.
 Leif Hoegh, a former Norwegian Shipowner.
 H. Montgomery Hyde, Member of Parliament, UK.
 C. D. Jackson, Publisher. Formerly Special Assistant to President Eisenhower 1953–1954
 Nelson Dean Jay, American banker. Director of J. P. Morgan & Co. Inc. New York.
 P. Kanellopoulos, Member of Parliament. Minister of National Defense.
 S. Karasoylu, CEO of Tiyyes Ltd.
 V. J. Koningsberger, Professor State, University of Utrecht.
 Ole Bjørn Kraft, Member of Parliament. Former Foreign Minister.
 P. M. A. Leverkuehn, Member of Parliament.
 Giovanni F. Malagodi, Member of Parliament.
 Finn Moe, Member of Parliament.
 Roger Motz , Senator of Belgium. Chairman of the Liberal International.
 Rudolf Mueller, German Lawyer.
 George C. McGhee,	U.S Industrialist
 George Nebolsine,	U.S Lawyer.
 Henk Oosterhuis, Member of Parliament. President of the Netherlands Federation of Trade Unions.
 Cola G. Parker, U.S Industrialist.
 George Walbridge Perkins, Jr., U.S Industrialist. Assistant Secr. of State for European Affairs, 1949–1953.
 Harry Pilkington, U.K President of Federation of British Industries.
 Antoine Pinay, French Member of Parliament. Former Prime Minister.
 Panagiotis Pipinelis, Former Foreign Minister and Former Ambassador to U.S.S.R.
 Alberto Pirelli, Italian Industrialist. Minister of State.
 Józef Retinger, Polish Political advisor (co-founder)
 , Ambassador to France and Former Ambassador to the U.S.S.R.
 David Rockefeller, U.S banker
 Ludwig Rosenberg,	German Chief of Department of Foreign Affairs of the Trade Unions.
 Paolo Rossi, Italian Member of Parliament.
 Denis de Rougemont, Author and Director European Cultural Center
 Paul Rijkens, Dutch Industrialist. Chairman of company Unilever N.V.
 Ernst Georg Schneider, U.S Industrialist and President of Chamber of Commerce of Düsseldorf
 Joseph P. Spang jr., U.S Industrialist. President of The Gillette Co.
 Max Steenberghe, Former Minister of Economic Affairs of the Netherlands.
 H. P. Teitgen, Vice-President of the Council of Ministers.
 Terkel M. Terkelsen, Chief Editor, Berlingske Tidende.
 Herbert Tingsten, Chief Editor of Dagens Nyheter.
 Heinrich Troeger, German Minister of Finance of Hessen.
 Vittorio Valletta, Italian Industrialist. former President of FIAT.
 André Voisin, President of "La Federation".
 H. F. van Walsem, Dutch industrialist. Member of the Board of Philips Industries Eindhoven.
 Jean Willems, Fondation Universitaire
 Thomas Williamson, General Secretary of National Union of General and Municipal Workers.
 Paul van Zeeland, Belgian lawyer, economist, politician and statesman

References
 Participant list 1954 (incomplete docu)

External links
 Official website

1954 conferences
1954 in the Netherlands
Bilderberg Group